Kanaloa manoa is a species of amphipod crustacean, and the only species in the genus Kanaloa.

References

Gammaridea
Crustaceans described in 1970